Li Jingxi (1857–18 September 1925) was a politician in the Qing Dynasty and Republic of China. He was born in Anhui and was the nephew of Li Hongzhang. He was the Premier of State Council in May–July 1917. During the Qing Dynasty, he was the last viceroy of Yun-Gui from 1909 to 1911.

References

1857 births
1925 deaths
Premiers of the Republic of China
Viceroys of Yun-Gui